Mount Seymour is a mountain located in Mount Seymour Provincial Park in the District of North Vancouver, British Columbia, Canada. Mount Seymour is most commonly identified for its ski area of the same name, and as a popular hiking area. It is named in honour of Frederick Seymour, second governor of the Colony of British Columbia. The name is used to refer to the ridge although the main summit is one of several, and is also known as Third Peak.

History
The mountain opened for skiing in 1938 under the ownership of the Swedish emigrant, Harald Enqvist, with a cafeteria and ski rental. A few years later, in 1949, the Government of British Columbia bought the ski area. The Government did not have the experience to run a ski area, so, they issued Mr. Enqvist the first Park Use Permit to operate the area. When the permit expired in 1951, the government found a concessionaire, who was put in charge of running the lifts, ski school and cafeteria. The name Enqvist was later spelled Enquist giving name to "The Enquist Lodge" and "Enquist Tube Park" among other facilities. The government retained overall ownership until 1984, when it privatized its operation as part of a cost-cutting measure.

The ski area has been run by the Wood family since 1984. They installed the Lodge chairlift in 1986 and the Brockton chairlift in the early 1990s. Starting in the 2010s, the mountain has been more aggressively upgraded. The original Mystery Peak chairlift was removed in 2012 and replaced with a high-speed quad, while the Goldie rope tow was replaced with a magic carpet.

On January 19, 2014,  search and rescue leader Tim Jones died while coming down from the North Shore Rescue team cabin on Mount Seymour. Jones had saved many lives on the mountain over the years. Shortly after his passing a community movement was formed to name the yet-unnamed Second Peak of Seymour after him.  The BC government officially named the place Tim Jones Peak in 2017.

Vegetation

Recreation

Facilities

The Mount Seymour ski area has four lifts, the Mystery Peak Express high-speed quad chairlift, Brockton and Lodge double chairlifts, and the Goldie Lake covered magic carpet. Another double chairlift, the Ridge Chair, was destroyed in a windstorm in 1998, and is currently still standing, though gradually rotting away. Another beginner lift, the Goldie Ropetow was removed in 2011 replaced by the magic carpet. Skiing and snowboarding are available on 40 marked trails and many unmarked routes. Four additional terrain parks exist for freestyle activities. Terrain has also been developed for snowtubing and tobogganing.

Guided and unguided snowshoeing takes place on a separate  network of maintained trails.  Backcountry access for snowshoeing and camping is permitted.

Mount Seymour's Enquist Cabin, located in the Tube Park Parking Lot was destroyed in a fire in the late spring of 2005. The cabin was available for rental and was the home of the Mount Seymour Ski Club. This cabin has been rebuilt, and has been in operation since the beginning of the 2010/2011 season.

Snow depth
Mount Seymour has three weather stations: one at the bottom of the Mystery Peak Chairlift, one near tower 9 of the Mystery Peak Chairlift, and one just below Brockton Point which is the top lift station of the Brockton Chairlift.

Broadcasting
Several Vancouver-area broadcasters use transmission towers located on Mount Seymour. On 16 December 1953, the first television broadcast in Western Canada was transmitted from this site by the Canadian Broadcasting Corporation's CBUT Channel 2. The CBC broadcasting site on Mount Seymour was both the first television broadcasting site in Western Canada and the first high elevation/mountain top broadcasting site in Canada.

FM stations
 CBU-2-FM 88.1 (CBC Radio One)
 CBUX-FM 90.9 (ICI Musique)
 CKYE-FM 93.1 (Red FM)
 CJJR-FM 93.7 (JR-FM)
 CFBT-FM 94.5 (Virgin Radio 94.5)
 CKZZ-FM 95.3 (Z 95.3)
 CHKG-FM 96.1 (Fairchild Radio)
 CJAX-FM 96.9 (Jack FM)
 CBUF-FM 97.7 (ICI Radio-Canada Première)
 CFOX-FM 99.3 (99.3 The Fox)
 CFMI-FM 101.1 (Rock 101)
 CKPK-FM 102.7 (The Peak)
 CHQM-FM 103.5 (103.5 QM/FM)
 CHHR-FM 104.3 (LG 104.3 FM)
 CKKS-FM-2 104.9 (Kiss Radio)
 CBU-FM 105.7 (CBC Radio 2)
 CKAV-FM-2 106.3 (Aboriginal Voices Radio)

TV stations
 CBUT-DT (CBC): UHF 35 (digital)
 CHAN-DT (Global): UHF 22 (digital)
 CIVI-DT-2 (rebroadcaster of CIVI-TV, CTV Two): UHF 17 (digital)
 CBUFT-DT (Radio-Canada): UHF 26 (digital)
 CIVT-DT (CTV): UHF 32 (digital)
 CHNM-DT (OMNI): UHF 20 (digital)
 CKVU-DT ("Citytv"): UHF 33 (digital)

Filming location
Due to its easy road access and ample parking lots, Mount Seymour is often used as a filming location.  Films and TV series shot using its forests, snowy slopes and region-spanning vistas include:

 MacGyver 
 Highlander: The Series
 Pathfinder
 Stargate SG-1
 X-Files
 Hot Tub Time Machine
 The Twilight Saga: Eclipse

See also
 List of ski areas and resorts in Canada
 Grouse Mountain
 Cypress Mountain

References

External links
 
 
 LiveTrails: Mount Seymour
 Mount Seymour Ski Resort
 Mount Seymour Ski Club
 Mount Seymour Hiking Trail Route Description

One-thousanders of British Columbia
Ski areas and resorts in British Columbia
North Vancouver (district municipality)
North Shore Mountains